Tropheops is a genus of cichlids endemic to Lake Malawi.

Species
There are currently 10 recognized species in this genus:

 Tropheops biriwira Li, Konings & Stauffer, 2016
 Tropheops gracilior (Trewavas, 1935)
 Tropheops kamtambo Li, Konings & Stauffer, 2016
 Tropheops kumwera Li, Konings & Stauffer, 2016
 Tropheops lucerna Trewavas, 1935 
 Tropheops macrophthalmus (C. G. E. Ahl, 1926)
 Tropheops microstoma (Trewavas, 1935)
 Tropheops modestus (D. S. Johnson, 1974)
 Tropheops novemfasciatus (Regan, 1922)
 Tropheops romandi (Colombé, 1979)
 Tropheops tropheops (Regan, 1922)

References

 
Haplochromini

Freshwater fish genera
Cichlid genera
Taxa named by Ethelwynn Trewavas
Taxonomy articles created by Polbot